Queen of Scotland was the first steamship on the Aberdeen-London service, and the first paddle steamer built in Aberdeen's shipyards. Duffus & Co. ceased business in 1846. Launched in 1827 by Duffus & Co., the vessel was involved in an accident in 1833 at Northfleet, when the steamship ran down the 410 ton United Kingdom, a rum and sugar vessel arrived from Jamaica. Queen of Scotland, though wooden-hulled, was undamaged and continued to serve the route.

References

1827 ships
Ships built in Aberdeen